The newsboy cap, newsie cap, or baker boy hat (British) is a casual-wear cap similar in style to the flat cap. 

It has a similar overall shape and stiff peak (visor) in front as a flat cap, but the body of the cap is rounder, made of eight pieces, fuller, and paneled with a button on top, and often with a button attaching the front to the brim (as the flat cap sometimes has).

History
The style was popular in Europe and North America in the early 20th century among both boys and adult men. As the name suggests, it was at the time associated with newspaper boys. This gives rise to a misunderstanding. It is true that many newspaper boys and other working boys at the time wore flat caps along with other styles. This style was not, however, worn only by boys. 

Flat caps were very common for North American and European men and boys of all classes during the early 20th century and were almost universal during the 1910s-20s, particularly among the working "lower" classes. A great many photographs of the period show these caps worn not only by newsboys, but by dockworkers, high steel workers, shipwrights, costermongers, farmers, beggars, bandits, artisans, and tradesmen of many types. This is also well attested in novels and films of this period and just after. Eight-piece style caps are essentially an offshoot of a scottish tam o' shanter. 

While they were worn by boys and men of all social classes, they were worn by the "upper" classes primarily for leisure activities, and the style became associated with well-to-do country sportsmen, drivers, and wealthy golfers.

Resurgence

Although traditionally a men's cap, it has recently seen a resurgence as it has become popular with affluent women and fashion houses in the 2000s. It has also become popular among the hipster subculture. Baker boy hats are now seen in many high street retailers. For summer, many girls and women are choosing soft cotton options as the brim offers sun protection. In winter, wool blend baker boy hats are a popular option for those who want to wear a natural material. In 2011, floral cottons are the current trend following a renewed interest in home sewing.

Roots Canada outfitted the Canadian Olympic team at the 1998 Winter Olympics in Nagano, Japan. The outfit's most popular item was the red "poorboy" cap (or poor boy cap) worn backwards.

Brian Johnson of AC/DC is frequently photographed wearing this style of hat. 

David Beckham is frequently photographed wearing his signature baker boy hat from James Lock & Co.

WWE Sami Zayn wears this style hat.

Impractical Jokers's Brian Quinn commonly wears this style of hat in many of episodes.

The hat is worn by the Shelby family and their associates in the British TV series "Peaky Blinders".

See also
Ascot cap
Coppola cap
Flat cap

References

External links
Boys' flat caps Historical Boys' Clothing website.  American Newsie caps were one of many names for the flat cap.

1890s fashion
1900s fashion
1910s fashion
1920s fashion
1930s fashion
1940s fashion
1950s fashion
1960s fashion
1970s fashion
1980s fashion
1990s fashion
2000s fashion
2010s fashion
Caps
Victorian fashion